Madison Hubbell (born February 24, 1991) is an American former ice dancer. She competed with Zachary Donohue from 2011 to 2022. With him, she is a two-time 2022 Winter Olympics medalist, a four-time World medalist, the 2018 Grand Prix Final champion, the 2014 Four Continents champion, and a three-time U.S. national champion (2018–2019, 2021).

She competed in ice dance with her brother Keiffer Hubbell from 2001 to 2011. With him, she is the 2010 Four Continents bronze medalist, 2006 JGP Final champion, and two-time U.S. national pewter medalist (2009, 2011).

Personal life 
Madison Hubbell was born on February 24, 1991, in Lansing, Michigan. She is the daughter of Susan, a seamstress, and Brad Hubbell, a lawyer, and has two older brothers, Keiffer and Zachary.

Hubbell began dating Spanish ice dancer Adrián Díaz in 2014. The couple announced their engagement in April 2018.

Early career
Madison Hubbell started skating as a five-year-old. She began ice dancing at age eight, skating with her first partner, Nicholas Donahue, for one year. She teamed up with her brother, Keiffer Hubbell, in early 2001. They originally represented the Lansing Skating Club in competition.

Competing on the juvenile level, the Hubbells placed 7th at the 2002 U.S. Junior Championships and won gold at the 2003 U.S. Junior Championships. They began representing the Ann Arbor Figure Skating Club in the 2003–2004 season. They won gold competing on the intermediate level at the 2004 U.S. Junior Championships.

In the 2004–2005 season, the Hubbells moved up to the novice level, which is the first level that competes at the U.S. Championships. At the 2005 U.S. Championships, the Hubbells finished 5th overall. At the Estonia International Dance Competition, which was their first major international event, the Hubbells won all three segments of the competition and won the gold medal. This medal qualified the Hubbells for the USFSA reserve team for the following season.

The Hubbells won the novice silver medal at the 2006 U.S. Championships, scoring 1.39 points less than the champions, Cathy Reed / Chris Reed.

2006–2007 season: Junior debut 
The Hubbells moved up to the junior level both nationally and internationally. Making their ISU Junior Grand Prix debut in Courchevel, France, the Hubbells placed second in the compulsory and original dances and then won the free dance. They won the silver medal behind Ekaterina Bobrova / Dmitri Soloviev by a margin of 0.78 points. The Hubbells were then assigned to their second event, in The Hague, Netherlands. They placed third in the compulsory dance segment and then won both the original and free dances to win the gold medal overall by a margin of victory of 1.84 points ahead of silver medalists Grethe Grünberg / Kristian Rand. These two placements combined qualified them for the 2006–2007 ISU Junior Grand Prix Final, for which the Hubbells were the third-ranked qualifiers. Qualifying for the event had also given them a bye to the U.S. Championships.

At the Junior Grand Prix Final, the Hubbells placed second in the Midnight Blues compulsory dance by a margin of 0.17 points behind Bobrova/Soloviev. They won both the original and free dances to win the gold medal overall by a margin of victory of 2.17 points ahead of silver medalists and training mates Emily Samuelson / Evan Bates.

At the 2007 U.S. Championships, the Hubbells placed second in both compulsory dances behind Samuelson/Bates. They won the original dance and went into the free dance in first place overall, where they placed second. They won the silver medal overall, placing second by a margin of 0.17 points behind champions Samuelson / Bates, and 24.56 points ahead of bronze medalists and training-mates Lynn Kriengkrairut / Logan Giulietti-Schmitt. The top three junior dance teams were named to the 2007 Junior Worlds, and all three junior teams were coached by Yaroslava Nechaeva and Yuri Chesnichenko.

At the 2007 Junior Worlds, the Hubbells both fell in the Silver Samba compulsory dance and placed twelfth in that segment of the competition. They placed fifth in the original dance and fourth in the free dance to move up to place sixth overall.

2007–2008 season
The Hubbells withdrew from their 2007–08 ISU Junior Grand Prix events and missed the fall season due to an injury to Keiffer. They returned to competition at the Midwestern Sectional Championships, winning all three segments to qualify for the 2008 U.S. Championships. At the national championships, the Hubbells won the compulsory dance, placed third in the original dance, and then won the free dance to win the gold medal overall. At the 2008 World Junior Championships, the Hubbells placed fifth in all three segments of the competition and fifth overall.

2008–2009 season: Senior national debut

The Hubbells moved up to the senior level nationally and remained juniors internationally. They competed on the 2008–09 ISU Junior Grand Prix. At their first event in Mexico City, Mexico, they won all three segments of the competition to win the gold medal by a margin of victory of 17.26 points ahead of silver medalists Kharis Ralph / Asher Hill. The Hubbells were then assigned to their second event, the event in Cape Town, South Africa, where they again won all three segments of the competition to win the gold medal by a margin of victory of 9.25 points ahead of silver medalists Piper Gilles / Zachary Donohue. These two placements combined qualified them for the 2008–09 ISU Junior Grand Prix Final, for which the Hubbells were the top-ranked qualifiers. Qualifying for the Junior Grand Prix Final also gave them a bye to the U.S. Championships.

The Junior Grand Prix Final was held for the first time concurrently with the Grand Prix Final and therefore did not include a compulsory dance segment. The Hubbells fell during the original dance and placed sixth in that segment of the competition. They placed second in the free skate and won the silver medal overall, scoring 6.47 points less than champions Madison Chock / Greg Zuerlein.

The Hubbells made their senior national debut at the 2009 U.S. Championships. They placed fourth in the compulsory dance, the original dance, and the free dance, to place fourth overall and win the pewter medal. At the 2009 World Junior Championships, the Hubbells placed second in the compulsory dance, third in the original dance, and fourth in the free skate to place fourth overall, scoring 0.46 points less than bronze medalists Ekaterina Riazanova / Jonathan Guerreiro.

2009–2010 season: Four Continents bronze 
Following the 2009 Trophée Éric Bompard competition, the Hubbells moved from Yaroslava Nechaeva and Yuri Chesnichenko, who had coached them in Ann Arbor, Michigan for 10 years, to Pasquale Camerlengo and Anjelika Krylova in Detroit, Michigan. They won the bronze medal at the 2010 Four Continents Championships.

2010–2011 season 
The Hubbells finished fourth at the 2011 U.S. Championships. On May 12, 2011, they announced the end of their partnership. Keiffer had experienced hip and back problems and was undecided about his future.

Hubbell and Donohue

2011–2012 season 

On May 12, 2011, U.S. Figure Skating announced that Hubbell had teamed up with Zachary Donohue. The two decided to train at the Detroit Skating Club under the guidance of the coaching team of Pasquale Camerlengo, Anjelika Krylova, and Natalia Annenko-Deller.

Hubbell/Donohue made their international debut at the 2011 Nebelhorn Trophy, winning the gold medal. After taking bronze at the 2012 U.S. Championships, they were selected to compete at two ISU Championships; they placed fifth at the 2012 Four Continents in Colorado Springs, Colorado, and tenth at the 2012 World Championships in Nice, France.

2012–2013 season 
Hubbell/Donohue took bronze at the 2012 Finlandia Trophy and competed at two Grand Prix events. They placed fifth at the 2012 Skate Canada International and fourth at the 2012 Trophée Éric Bompard (second in the free dance). After finishing fourth at the 2013 U.S. Championships, they were not selected for any ISU Championships.

2013–2014 season: Four Continents gold 
After sustaining a concussion in June 2013, Hubbell spent six weeks recuperating. She attributed the injury to a "lack of focus, as painful as that is to admit. I finished twizzles, I did my 3-turn, and I fell off my heel."

Hubbell/Donohue won gold at the 2013 Nebelhorn Trophy, placed fourth at the 2013 Skate America, and won their first Grand Prix medal, bronze, at the 2013 Skate Canada International. After placing fourth at the 2014 U.S. Championships, they were assigned to the 2014 Four Continents Championships and finished ahead of Piper Gilles / Paul Poirier to take the gold medal. Hubbell/Donohue were first alternates for the 2014 World Championships but did not take the slot made available when Meryl Davis / Charlie White withdrew; Hubbell had sustained a torn labrum in her left hip and underwent surgery in March 2014.

2014–2015 season 
Hubbell/Donohue won bronze at both of their Grand Prix events, the 2014 Skate Canada International and 2014 Trophée Éric Bompard, and then took bronze at the 2015 U.S. Championships. They placed 10th at the 2015 World Championships in Shanghai, China.

On April 13, 2015, Hubbell/Donohue announced that they had started training with Marie-France Dubreuil and Patrice Lauzon at the Centre Gadbois in Montreal.

2015–2016 season 
In November 2015, Hubbell/Donohue won their first Grand Prix title, taking gold at the 2015 Trophée Éric Bompard in Bordeaux as a result of their first place in the short dance, ahead of Canada's Piper Gilles / Paul Poirier. The second day of competition was canceled due to the November 2015 Paris attacks. After winning bronze at the 2015 NHK Trophy, the two qualified to their first Grand Prix Final, where they finished sixth.

Hubbell/Donohue took the bronze medal at the 2016 U.S. Championships. They placed fourth at the 2016 Four Continents Championships in Taipei and sixth at the 2016 World Championships in Boston.

2016–2017 season 
Ranked third in both segments at the 2017 U.S. Championships, Hubbell/Donohue remained national bronze medalists for a third consecutive year. In February, they placed fourth in the short dance, sixth in the free, and fourth overall at the 2017 Four Continents Championships in Gangneung, South Korea.

In March, Hubbell/Donohue won a small bronze medal for their short dance at the 2017 World Championships in Helsinki, Finland. They dropped to ninth overall after placing tenth in the free dance.

2017–2018 season: World silver 
Hubbell/Donohue began their season with gold at the 2017 CS U.S. International Classic. After taking bronze at the 2017 Skate Canada International and silver at the 2017 NHK Trophy, they qualified to their third consecutive Grand Prix Final. They finished fourth at the event in Nagoya, Japan.

At the 2018 U.S. Championships, Hubbell/Donohue placed second behind Maia and Alex Shibutani in the short dance and then second to Madison Chock / Evan Bates in the free dance. They won their first national title by a margin of 0.19 over the Shibutanis and 0.52 over Chock/Bates. All of the ice dancing medalists were named to the U.S. Olympic team.

Hubbell/Donohue were not selected for the team event but competed in the individual ice dancing event. In the short dance, they placed third, behind training mates Tessa Virtue / Scott Moir and Gabriella Papadakis / Guillaume Cizeron, and 0.02 points ahead of the Shibutanis. In the free dance, Donohue put both hands down in the middle of a sliding move, which constituted a technical fall. As a result, they finished fifth in the free dance and fourth overall, 4.90 points behind the bronze medalists, the Shibutanis.

In March, Hubbell/Donohue won silver at the 2018 World Championships in Milan, having placed second in both segments.

2018–2019 season: World bronze 
Beginning the season again with a win at the U.S. Classic, Hubbell and Donohue were assigned to consecutive Grand Prix events, the 2018 Skate America and 2018 Skate Canada International.  They won gold at both events, becoming the first team to qualify for the Grand Prix Final.  After victory at Skate Canada International, Hubbell observed, "we wanted to challenge ourselves to become champions in difficult situations, and we knew that it was going to be really challenging to do two Grand Prix back to back at the beginning of the season."  At the Grand Prix Final, they placed first in both programs and won the title.

At the 2019 U.S. Championships, facing a returning Chock/Bates, they won their second straight national title.  They next competed at the 2019 Four Continents Championships, placing first in the rhythm dance with a new personal best.  In the free dance, they unexpectedly dropped to fourth place following multiple errors, including receiving only a base level on their stationary lift after it was deemed non-stationary.  As a result, they finished off the podium behind Chock/Bates, Kaitlyn Weaver / Andrew Poje, and Gilles/Poirier.  Hubbell commented after, "certainly we would rather it happens here than the Worlds."

Hubbell/Donohue placed fourth in the rhythm dance at the 2019 World Championships, but overtook Alexandra Stepanova / Ivan Bukin in the free dance to place third overall, winning the bronze.  Hubbell called it "our strongest performance this season", saying that their "goal was to do our best performance and the rest we can't control, and that was really what we have achieved."  They next were part of the gold medal-winning Team USA at the 2019 World Team Trophy, concluding their season.

2019–2020 season: Four Continents bronze 
For the musical-themed rhythm dance, Hubbell/Donohue chose to skate a Marilyn Monroe program, a longtime goal of Hubbell's.  Hubbell/Donohue were again assigned to the same consecutive events for the Grand Prix.  They became two-time Skate America champions with a total of 209.55 points after placing first with a personal best of 84.97 points in the rhythm dance and second in the free dance with a score of 124.58, 0.08 points behind the free dance score of silver medalists Stepanova/Bukin.  Donohue was suffering from bronchitis at the time of the event and commented that he hoped to have "two working lungs" by their next competition the following week.  At 2019 Skate Canada International the following week, they narrowly led after the rhythm dance, 0.63 points ahead of Gilles/Poirier.  They placed second in the free dance, and took the silver medal, in what was considered a significant upset loss.

Qualifying to the Grand Prix Final, Hubbell/Donohue placed second in the rhythm dance. Third in the free dance after having revised nine of the program elements in the interim since Skate Canada International, they won the bronze medal overall.

Entering the 2020 U.S. Championships seeking to win a third consecutive title, they placed second in the rhythm dance, with Donohue slightly losing balance at one point in the Finnstep pattern and their lift being graded at only a level 3. They finished second in the free dance as well, struggling after they came out of their dance spin facing the wrong direction, prompting Hubbell to comment that it was "probably one of the hardest performances, not enjoyable."  They won the silver medal behind Chock/Bates.

Returning to the Four Continents Championships after the disappointment of the previous year, Hubbell/Donohue won the rhythm dance again, albeit by a margin of only 0.03 over Chock/Bates, and 2.03 points ahead of Gilles/Poirier in third.  In the free dance, both made errors in their twizzle sequence, and they dropped to third place, winning the bronze medal.  Hubbell admitted afterward that "our free dance has been a rocky one for us this season."  They were assigned to compete at the World Championships in Montreal, but these were canceled as a result of the COVID-19 pandemic.

2020–2021 season: World silver 
Hubbell and Donohue recruited former training partner and double-Olympic champion Scott Moir as one of their choreographers for the new season, planning to regain momentum lost in the previous year, which they attributed in part to losing confidence in their programs after their loss at Skate Canada.  With the ISU assigning the Grand Prix based mainly on training location to minimize international travel, Hubbell/Donohue were nevertheless assigned to the 2020 Skate America in Las Vegas and crossed the border to compete.  They won the event for the third consecutive year.

Hubbell/Donohue returned to the United States again for the 2021 U.S. Championships, also held in Las Vegas.  They placed second in the rhythm dance, 0.44 points behind Chock/Bates, who had not competed at Skate America due to injury.  They won the free dance, skating cleanly, while Chock/Bates had a twizzle error and took their third national title.  They were named to the American team for the 2021 World Championships in Stockholm.

The World Championships were held in a bubble without an audience, and Hubbell/Donohue's training partners and four-time World champions Papadakis/Cizeron declined to attend due to illness and lack of training time, leading to a very contested podium.  Hubbell/Donohue placed second in the rhythm dance, two points behind Sinitsina/Katsalapov of Russia and narrowly ahead of Chock/Bates.  They were third in the free dance, behind Sinitsina/Katsalapov and Canada's Gilles/Poirier, but remained in second overall by 0.36 points over Gilles/Poirier and won their second silver medal. Their placement combined with Chock/Bates' fourth qualified three berths for American ice dance teams at the 2022 Winter Olympics.

2021–2022 season: Olympic silver and bronze and World silver 
Hubbell/Donohue announced heading into the 2021–22 season that it would be their last before retiring. They won the 2021 U.S. Classic as their opening assignment, which for that season was not part of the Challenger series.

On the Grand Prix, Hubbell/Donohue began at 2021 Skate America, competing against primary domestic rivals Chock/Bates. They won both segments of the competition to take the gold medal, their fourth consecutive at the event and prevailing over Chock/Bates by 1.31 points. Donohue remarked afterward on his "overwhelming gratitude, being our last Skate America and four consecutive wins for us, it means quite a lot, especially to be able to have a live audience" following the pandemic restrictions in the preceding year and a half. They were initially assigned to the 2021 Cup of China as their second Grand Prix, but following its cancellation, they were reassigned to the 2021 Gran Premio d'Italia. With training partners Papadakis/Cizeron also assigned to the event, Hubbell/Donohue were the presumptive silver medalists, and finished second in both segments of the competition despite a late-program flub on their free dance choreographic lift. Hubbell joked afterward, "we made a mistake at the end, but sometimes you jump in the air, and you hit your partner in the crotch." Their results qualified them to the Grand Prix Final, but it was subsequently canceled due to restrictions prompted by the Omicron variant.

Seeking to defend their title at the 2022 U.S. Championships, Hubbell/Donohue placed second in the rhythm dance due to errors, ending up 2.55 points behind Chock/Bates. They went on to win the free dance but remained in second place overall. Hubbell said, "we wanted to end our career here at the U.S. Championships with a performance that felt present, and we're both very satisfied with how we skated. I think stepping off the ice; we knew we were content with what we put out there." They were subsequently named to the American Olympic team.

Hubbell/Donohue began the 2022 Winter Olympics as the American entries in the rhythm dance segment of the Olympic team event. They scored a new personal best of 86.56 to win the segment, securing ten points for the American team and notably prevailing over reigning World champions Sinitsina/Katsalapov of the ROC. Donohue, pleased with the results, said that "opening up our Olympics this way is really an honor." Team USA won the silver medal, Hubbell and Donohue's first Olympic medal. In the ice dance event, they finished in third place in the rhythm dance with another new personal best score of 87.13. Third in the free dance, despite a deduction for an extended lift, they won the bronze medal.

Hubbell and Donohue concluded their competitive careers at the 2022 World Championships, held in Montpellier. They finished second in the rhythm dance with a personal best score of 89.72, 3.01 points behind training mates Papadakis/Cizeron. In the free dance they set another personal best (132.67) as well as a personal best for total score (222.39), winning their third World silver medal. With Papadakis/Cizeron taking the gold medal and Chock/Bates the bronze, the entire podium consisted of skaters from the Ice Academy of Montreal. Hubbell said, "we knew that we wanted to skate our best for each other for our last moment, and we found peace in that. We're just very happy."

Coaching Career 
In the summer of 2022, it was announced that she and her fiancée, Adrián Díaz, would begin coaching and choreographing for ice dancers at the Ice Academy of Montreal campus in London, Ontario alongside Scott Moir.

Her current students include:
Christina Carreira / Anthony Ponomarenko
Haley Sales / Nikolas Wamsteeker

Programs

With Donohue

With Hubbell

Competitive highlights 
GP: Grand Prix; CS: Challenger Series; JGP: Junior Grand Prix

With Donohue

With Hubbell

Detailed results 
Small medals for short and free programs awarded only at ISU Championships.

With Donohue

References

External links

 
 

1991 births
Living people
American female ice dancers
Figure skaters at the 2018 Winter Olympics
Figure skaters at the 2022 Winter Olympics
Medalists at the 2022 Winter Olympics
Olympic silver medalists for the United States in figure skating
Olympic bronze medalists for the United States in figure skating
World Figure Skating Championships medalists
Four Continents Figure Skating Championships medalists
Sportspeople from Lansing, Michigan
Sportspeople from Okemos, Michigan
21st-century American women